Simonstown may refer to the following places:

 Simon's Town, a suburb of Cape Town, South Africa
 Simon's Town Naval Base, South Africa's largest naval base, situated at Simon's Town near Cape Town
 Simonstown, Kilbride, a townland in County Westmeath, Ireland

See also 
 Simonstown Agreement, a naval agreement between South Africa and the United Kingdom
 Simonstown Gaels GAA, a Gaelic Athletic Association club based in County Meath, Ireland